Catterick Garrison is a major garrison and military town  south of Richmond, North Yorkshire, England. It is the largest British Army garrison in the world, with a population of around 13,000 in 2017 and covering over 2,400 acres (about 10 km2). Under plans announced by the Ministry of Defence (MoD) in November 2005, its population is expected to grow to over 25,000, making it the largest population centre in the local area.

History 
The siting of the garrison was first recommended by Robert Baden-Powell who founded the Scouting movement in 1908 whilst he, as Inspector-General of Cavalry, was based at the army barracks—at that time located in Richmond Castle. On 12 August 1914, the order was issued for the construction of the camp, following the outbreak of the First World War. The original intention was for Catterick to be a temporary camp to accommodate two complete divisions with around 40,000 men in 2,000 huts.

The base was originally named Richmond Camp but was changed to Catterick Camp in 1915, and later modified to Catterick Garrison in 1973. After serving as a prisoner of war camp at the end of the war, the idea to make Catterick a permanent military barracks was first suggested after the partitioning of Ireland in 1921. The required land was purchased and building plans were put forward in 1923. Construction was undertaken by John Laing & Son, and by the mid-1930s most of the camp's facilities were complete. During the Second World War the camp was once again used to house prisoners of war.

In 2018, to celebrate the centenary of the Armistice and the end of the First World War, four stone monuments, including a steam locomotive and a likeness of Lord Baden Powell, were erected on the town's central roundabout.

Governance 
The town lies in the Richmondshire district of North Yorkshire, within the Central Richmondshire electoral division of North Yorkshire County Council and divided between the Hipswell and Scotton wards of Richmondshire District Council.

The town is divided between two civil parishes, the southern part of the town, south of a small stream known as Leadmill Gill, is in the civil parish of Scotton, the northern part forms the greater part of the civil parish of Hipswell. Each parish has its own parish council.

Catterick Garrison is also within the Richmond (Yorks) parliamentary constituency, which has been represented since 2015 by Conservative Rishi Sunak.

Geography 
Catterick Garrison is located on the A6136 road, connecting Richmond with the A1(M) at Catterick Village,  to the east.

Foxglove Covert, a local nature reserve, was the first of its kind in North Yorkshire and the first to be located on Ministry of Defence (MoD) land in the UK. It covers 100 acres of moorland edge, and was opened in 1992. In 2001 it was declared a Site of Local Nature Conservation Importance (SLNCI).

Economy 
Lacking a true town centre, the garrison gained its first large supermarket, a Tesco store, in 2000; along with a retail park known as Richmondshire Walk, which also includes a McDonald's, a Poundstretcher and a Peacocks, among others. In 2013 a £25 million development scheme for a new town centre was unveiled, to be built on a former sports ground, owned by the MoD. The plan included space for retail outlets, a cinema, a 60-bedroom hotel and several dining establishments and bars; creating up to 700 jobs. In 2015, the plans came to fruition when Princes Gate retail complex opened adjacent to Richmondshire Walk, with tenants including a Premier Inn, an Empire cinema, Poundland, Next, and Hungry Horse.

Transport 
There is no longer a railway station at the garrison.

Education 
Primary education is provided by Carnagill Community Primary School, built in 1966, Wavell School, Le Cateau Community Primary School and Cambrai Primary School, a free school opened in 2019 on the complex formerly housing a campus of Darlington College.  Pupils then receive secondary education at Risedale School. Alternatively, children may also attend school at Richmond School and Sixth Form College.

Religion 
The town has three existing churches, St. Joan of Arc is a Roman Catholic memorial church built in 1930 and situated within the Diocese of Middlesbrough, but owing to its position is governed by the Bishopric of the Forces. on the same road is St. Aidan's Garrison Church, and The Garrison Memorial Church of St. Martin and St. Oswald.

Garrison Cemetery 
Catterick Garrison Cemetery, on the north side of St John's Churchyard in Hipswell, was opened by the War Office in 1930 to serve the camp. Among its graves are those of 42 Commonwealth service personnel of the Second World War and some Polish servicemen.

Previously soldiers from the camp and military hospital were buried in St John's Churchyard, which now contains the war graves of 64 Commonwealth service personnel of the First World War and two of the Second World War.

Community and culture

Sport 
The town's football club, Catterick Garrison Football Centre, was founded in 2006, and the senior team play in the Wensleydale Creamery League, an affiliate league of the North Riding County Football Association. The Catterick Crusaders rugby league team play in the North East Division of the Rugby League Conference, originally known as the Northallerton Stallions, they adopted their current name after relocation in 2012.

Media 
The town was formerly home to Garrison FM until 2013, when the Ministry of Defence merged Garrison FM's contract with that of overseas forces' station BFBS, who took over local broadcasting for the garrison area. The Catterick Garrison Military WAGS Choir, formed in 2010 was the basis for the BBC programme The Choir: Military Wives and the 2019 film Military Wives (film), which also has scenes filmed in the garrison itself.

Leisure facilities 
Catterick Leisure Centre is a purpose-built complex opposite the retail park, opened in July 2009; it offers a broad spectrum of leisure and fitness facilities including a swimming pool and a gym, as well as an adjoining public library.

Catterick Garrison once had one of Yorkshire's largest cinemas, the Ritz Cinema, which opened on 21 December 1940 and had over 1000 seats. It closed on 2 July 1977 after declining usage; today, the site is used as a health and beauty salon. The town would gain a seven screen cinema in 2015 as part of the Princes Gate retail complex.

Public services 

The town's primary healthcare provider is the Harewood Medical general practice managed by South Tees Hospitals NHS Foundation Trust. The Duchess of Kent Hospital was a military hospital opened on 6 October 1976 and closed its major surgery and hospital wings in 1999, it was still used as a medical facility until 2015, when services were relocated to RAF Leeming.

The local ambulances are run by the Yorkshire Ambulance Service, the town is also in the catchment area of the Great North Air Ambulance, North Yorkshire Fire and Rescue provide firefighting services and both North Yorkshire Police and the Royal Military Police have stations located on a shared complex.

Based units 

The garrison consists of many different groups of buildings spread over a wide area and includes a number of barracks, most of which are named after historical British Army battles, many of which took place in Northern France during the First World War. The current units based within Catterick Garrison include:

 Commander and Staff Trainer (North)
Alma Lines
1st Battalion, Yorkshire Regiment
 Cambrai Lines
Royal Lancers (Queen Elizabeth's Own)
Meggido Lines
 1st Close Support Battalion, Royal Electrical and Mechanical Engineers
Piave Lines
 521 Explosive Ordnance Disposal and Search Squadron
British Army Bands Catterick, Royal Corps of Army Music
Band of the Royal Armoured Corps
Band of the King's Division
Band of the Royal Electrical and Mechanical Engineers
 Bourlon Barracks
 The Highlanders, 4th Battalion, Royal Regiment of Scotland
 1st Military Intelligence Battalion, Intelligence Corps
Peronne Lines
Headquarters, 4th Infantry Brigade
Headquarters North East
Headquarters, Catterick Garrison
 Gaza Barracks
 The Light Dragoons
 5th Armoured Medical Regiment, Royal Army Medical Corps
 1st Regiment, Royal Military Police
Helles Barracks
Infantry Training Centre
Marne Barracks
 5th Regiment, Royal Artillery
 32nd Engineer Regiment, Royal Engineers
 Somme Barracks
1st Battalion, Scots Guards
Vimy Barracks
3 Army Education Centre Group, Adjutant General's Corps

HQ School of Infantry, Infantry Training Centre 

The Infantry Training Centre conducts infantry training combining Phase 1 and 2 of the Combat Infantryman's Course. Junior soldiers destined for the infantry continue to receive Phase 1 training at the Army Foundation College in Harrogate. ITC Catterick is the major user of the Warcop Training Area.

ITC Catterick is also home to the Army School of Ceremonial ('ASC'), where recruits learn to take part in the massed bands of the British Army. In 2016–17, the ASC moved from their former school (an old stately home) to modern facilities.

References

Citations

Bibliography

External links 

Official Community Website  – Catterick Garrison Online

 
Villages in North Yorkshire
Installations of the British Army
Richmondshire
British Army Garrisons